The Cricket was a cyclecar manufactured in Detroit, Michigan, by the Cricket Cyclecar Company in 1914. It was a small cyclecar driven by a two-cylinder engine with a two-speed transmission. The vehicle sold for $385 ($8520.00 in 2009 currency). The company combined late in 1914 with the Motor Products Company who manufactured motorcycles.

References

Notes

Defunct motor vehicle manufacturers of the United States
Motor vehicle manufacturers based in Michigan
Cyclecars
Defunct manufacturing companies based in Detroit